Cara or CARA may refer to:

Places
 Čara, a village on the island of Korčula, Croatia
 Cara, a village in Cojocna Commune, Cluj County, Romania
 Cara Island, off the west coast of Argyll, Scotland
 Cara Paraná River, Colombia
 Cara Sucia River, El Salvador
 Monte Cara, a mountain in the Republic of Cape Verde
 Mount Cara, a peak in Antarctica

People
 Cara Gass, a crazy girl
 Cara (given name), a given name for females
Surname:
 Alessia Cara, Canadian singer
 Ana Cara, Argentine creolist, translator, and professor 
 Jean-Paul Cara (born 1948), a French singer and composer
 Dominic "Mac" Anthony Cara (1914–1993), an American football end 
 Gaetano Cara (1803–1877), Italian archaeologist and naturalist primarily interested in ornithology
 Irene Cara (1959–2022), American singer and actress
 Marchetto Cara (c. 1470 – c. 1520), Italian composer of the Renaissance
 Nafissa Sid Cara (or Nafissa Sidkara;  1910–2002), a French politician
 Sin Cara, ring name of Mexican-American professional wrestler Jorge Arriaga
 Sin Cara, a former ring name of Mexican professional wrestler Luis Ignacio Urive Alvirde, better known by the ring name Místico
 Cara, an Albanian family name

Arts, entertainment, and media

Fictional characters
Cara Diana Hunter, protagonist of The Unicorn Chronicles
 Cara (Sword of Truth), a character in Terry Goodkind's Sword of Truth series
 Cara, a character in the OEL manga Next Exit

Other arts, entertainment, and media
  Chicano Art: Resistance and Affirmation, an influential Chicano art exhibition that toured in the 1990s
 Contemporary A Cappella Recording Award, an award given by the Contemporary A Cappella Society

Brands and enterprises
 Cara Operations, a franchise which owns restaurant chains

Organizations 
 CARA Brazzaville, a football club in the Republic of the Congo
 Center for Applied Research in the Apostolate, a Catholic social science research center located at Georgetown University.
Center of Administration of the Anosy Region, an NGO working for sustainable development in Tôlanaro, Madagascar
 Central Adoption Resource Authority (CARA), an organization within the Ministry of Women and Child Development, Government of India
 Classification and Rating Administration, a division of the Motion Picture Association that administers the MPA film rating system
 Compassion and Responsibility for Animals, a non-profit animal welfare group in the Philippines
 Council for At-Risk Academics, previously Council for Assisting Refugee Academics, a charitable organization

Other uses 
 Cara, a synonym for Anadara, a genus of molluscs
 Cara (horse) (1836–1857), British Thoroughbred racehorse and broodmare
 Cara cara navel, a type of orange
 Cara culture, an Andean civilization
 Cara Cup, an international professional rugby union tournament
 Cara language, a small Plateau language of Nigeria
 Combined altitude radar altimeter, a radar altimeter with both analog and digital displays
  Comprehensive Addiction and Recovery Act (CARA), a piece of US federal legislation enacted to fight addiction
 Constant absolute risk aversion, a term in Economics referring to a property of the exponential utility function

See also 
 Cara Sucia (disambiguation)
 Caras (disambiguation)
 Carra (disambiguation)
 Chara (disambiguation)
 Kara (disambiguation)
 Khara (disambiguation)